James G. Dickson, born 1891 in Yakima, Washington, died in 1962 in a plane crash in the Philippines, was an American mycologist.

Dickson did his undergraduate work at what is now Washington State University. He was a then a graduate student at the University of Wisconsin and later a professor there. Between graduation and his return to the University of Wisconsin he worked for the United States Department of Agriculture. He was an export on disease that infect crops, and wrote a widely used text book on this subject.

References

External links
Cybertruffle List of published works

1891 births
1962 deaths
American mycologists
Washington State University alumni
University of Wisconsin–Madison alumni
University of Wisconsin–Madison faculty